Abacetus thoracicus is a species of ground beetle in the subfamily Pterostichinae. It was described by Jeannel in 1948.

References

thoracicus
Beetles described in 1864